Hossein Sheikholeslam (29 November 1952 – 5 March 2020) was an Iranian conservative politician and diplomat who was advisor to the foreign minister Javad Zarif. He also was a member of the Seventh Islamic Parliament of Iran and previously the Iranian ambassador to Syria.
Sheikholeslam was Assistant to the parliament Speaker Ali Larijani for the International Affairs. 
Sheikholeslam was one of the students/militants who held Americans hostage during the Iran hostage crisis.

Sheikholeslam died as a result of COVID-19 on 5 March 2020.

References

External links 
 Nominees Deny Iranian Report on Hostages 16 October 1988

Members of the 7th Islamic Consultative Assembly
Iranian diplomats
1952 births
Ambassadors of Iran to Syria
Muslim Student Followers of the Imam's Line
Alliance of Builders of Islamic Iran politicians
Voice of Nation politicians
Islamic Society of Engineers politicians
2020 deaths
Deaths from the COVID-19 pandemic in Iran